Liverpool East Toxteth was a borough constituency represented in the House of Commons of the Parliament of the United Kingdom. It elected one Member of Parliament (MP) by the first past the post system of election.

Boundaries 
1885–1918: Part of the civil parish of Toxteth.

1918–1950: The County Borough of Liverpool wards of Aigburth, Granby, Sefton Park East, and Sefton Park West.

Members of Parliament

Elections

Elections in the 1880s

Elections in the 1890s

Elections in the 1900s

Elections in the 1910s 

General Election 1914–15:

Another General Election was required to take place before the end of 1915. The political parties had been making preparations for an election to take place and by the July 1914, the following candidates had been selected; 
Unionist: James Stuart Rankin
Liberal: John Lea

Elections in the 1920s 

 Rathbone was a member of Liverpool City Council at the time of the election, and received support from the local Liberal association and the Women's Citizenship Association.

Elections in the 1930s 

General Election 1939–40

Another General Election was required to take place before the end of 1940. The political parties had been making preparations for an election to take place and by the Autumn of 1939, the following candidates had been selected; 
Conservative: Patrick Buchan-Hepburn
Liberal: Lyon Blease

Elections in the 1940s

References

East Toxteth
Parliamentary constituencies in North West England (historic)
Constituencies of the Parliament of the United Kingdom established in 1885
Constituencies of the Parliament of the United Kingdom disestablished in 1950
Toxteth